Summerland Point is a suburb of the Central Coast region of New South Wales, Australia, located on a peninsula extending northwards into Lake Macquarie. It is part of the  local government area. It was formerly known as Gwandalan West.

Overview
Due to the access to Lake Macquarie, the rural roads and the lakefront access, Summerland Point is home to the Central Coast Triathlon Club which race there on the last Sunday of every month.

There are no schools in Summerland Point; however, most children there go to Gwandalan Public School or Lake Munmorah High School.

The town is popular with the boating fraternity due to its very sheltered boat launching ramp. The ramp is accessible by most trailerable vessels, which are launched into the sheltered Boat Harbour, a lagoon joined to Lake Macquarie by a short channel. There is also a jetty which has a pump out for marine toilet holding tanks.

The local shops include, as at November 2017, three restaurants (Chinese, Thai and pizza/Italian), a post office, hairdresser, furniture/nicknacks store, bakery cafe, real estate agent, mower shop, bottle shop, fish & chip shop, supermarket and service station. All are located within walking distance of the Boat Harbour.

References

External links
 History of Summerland Point

Suburbs of the Central Coast (New South Wales)